Greece competed at the Deaflympics for the first time in 1957. Greece won its first Deaflympics medal in 1993. Greece has never competed at the Winter Deaflympics.

Medal tallies

Summer Deaflympics

See also 
Greece at the Paralympics
Greece at the Olympics

References 

 
Deaf culture in Greece